Robert Peter Silvers is an American lawyer and government official who has served as the Under Secretary of Homeland Security for Strategy, Policy, and Plans since 2021.

Education 

Silvers received his Bachelor of Arts from the University of Pennsylvania, where he graduated summa cum laude and as valedictorian of the International Relations program and his Juris Doctor from New York University School of Law.

Legal and academic career 

After law school, he clerked for Judge Kim McLane Wardlaw of the United States Court of Appeals for the Ninth Circuit. Prior to joining DHS, Silvers was an attorney at the international law firm O'Melveny & Myers, where he handled complex transnational disputes and investigative matters for his clients. Silvers served as the Obama administration's Assistant Secretary for Cyber Policy at the U.S. Department of Homeland Security (DHS). He was responsible for engagement on cyber defense with the private sector, the federal government's response during significant cyber incidents, and building diplomatic coalitions to confront the most challenging issues involving security and digital innovation. Silvers previously served in other positions at DHS, including as Deputy Chief of Staff, managing execution of policy and operational priorities for the Department's 22 agencies and offices. Silvers is an adjunct professor in the Master of Science in Cybersecurity Risk and Strategy Program co-offered by New York University School of Law and the New York University Tandon School of Engineering. Silvers is a partner at the law firm Paul Hastings LLP and an experienced leader in national and homeland security. Silvers advises companies and boards of directors on cybersecurity, critical infrastructure protection, and other challenges at the intersection of business and security.

Under Secretary of Homeland Security 

In January 2021, Silvers name was suggested for a Department of Homeland Security position. On April 12, 2021, President Joe Biden announced Silvers as the nominee to be the Under Secretary of Homeland Security for Strategy, Policy, and Plans. On April 27, 2021, his nomination was sent to the United States Senate. His nomination is pending before the Senate Committee on Homeland Security and Governmental Affairs. On May 27, 2021, a hearing on his nomination was held before the Senate Committee on Homeland Security and Governmental Affairs. He was confirmed by the US Senate on August 5, 2021, by Unanimous Consent. He was sworn in on August 10, 2021.

Personal life 

A native of New York City, as of April 2021 Silvers lived in Washington, D.C. with his wife and their eight-year-old son and three-year-old daughter.

References 

American Jews
Living people
Year of birth missing (living people)
Biden administration personnel
Lawyers from New York City
New York (state) lawyers
New York University School of Law alumni
New York University School of Law faculty
Paul Hastings partners
People associated with O'Melveny & Myers
United States Department of Homeland Security officials
University of Pennsylvania alumni